Jørgen Hammergaard Hansen (c. 1930 – 22 August 2013) was a Danish badminton player who won numerous major international titles from the mid-1950s to the mid-1960s.

Career
Though he competed in singles at a strong international level during the first half of his career, it was as a doubles player that he made his mark, capturing six All-England men's doubles titles with Finn Kobberø (1955, 1956, 1961, 1962, 1963, 1964) and reaching the final round of the All-England mixed doubles on three occasions. Noted for his powerful smash which included an ability to smash off his backhand with the heavy rackets of the day, Hammergaard Hansen took part in five consecutive Thomas Cup (men's international team) campaigns for Denmark between 1952 and 1964, winning over 80 percent of his matches. In 1998 he was inducted into the Badminton Hall of Fame.

Achievements

International tournaments 
Men's doubles

Mixed doubles

References 

1930s births
Danish male badminton players
2013 deaths